Basalt Lake is a small freshwater lake surrounded by three basalt outcrops with ‘organ-pipe’ formations in their rocks, situated in the central part of the ice-free Byers Peninsula, Livingston Island in the South Shetland Islands, Antarctica. and draining through a  stream southwards into Bransfield Strait.

The feature is descriptively named from the surrounding rock formations.

Location

Map
 Península Byers, Isla Livingston. Mapa topográfico a escala 1:25000. Madrid: Servicio Geográfico del Ejército, 1992.
 L.L. Ivanov et al. Antarctica: Livingston Island and Greenwich Island, South Shetland Islands. Scale 1:100000 topographic map. Sofia: Antarctic Place-names Commission of Bulgaria, 2005.
 L.L. Ivanov. Antarctica: Livingston Island and Greenwich, Robert, Snow and Smith Islands. Scale 1:120000 topographic map. Troyan: Manfred Wörner Foundation, 2009.

References
 SCAR Composite Antarctic Gazetteer.

Bodies of water of Livingston Island
Lakes of the South Shetland Islands